Trevose is a  census-designated place within both Bensalem and Lower Southampton townships in Bucks County, Pennsylvania, United States. Trevose was formerly part of Feasterville-Trevose, but was split into two separate CDPs for the 2010 census.  U.S. 1 runs through the town as well as the Pennsylvania Turnpike, but Trevose's main road is Brownsville Road, which is the dividing line between the two townships. As of the 2010 census, Trevose had a population of 3,550.

The community is named after the home of settler Joseph Growden and itself after Growden's homestead in England (Growden was Cornish; Trevose is from the Cornish word Trenfos for farm.).

The town was hit by an unusually powerful EF3 tornado on July 29, 2021. The tornado, which directly impacted a car dealership, was recorded by many bystanders.

Demographics
As of the 2010 U.S. census the population of Trevose was 93.6% White, 1.9% African-American, 2.4% Asian, .2% American Indian or Alaska Native, .1% Native Hawaiian and Other Pacific Islander, and 1.2% Two or More Races. Approximately 3% of the population was Hispanic.

Trevose has an educated population with 5% of the population has received their Master’s Degree, 16% with a Bachelor’s Degree, 26% with some form of college or Associate degree, 38% with a High School Diploma, and 14% of the population with less than a High School Deploma as of the 2010 Census

Trevose is 54% Female and 48% Male. 22% of the population is under 18, while 13% is over 65 years of age.

As of 2010, Trevose has a median household income of $82,413 and a median individual income of $34,943. Trevose’s unemployment rate is 6.5% and the poverty is very low at only 1%.

Climate
According to the Köppen climate classification system, Trevose has a Humid subtropical climate (Cfa). Cfa climates are characterized by all months having an average mean temperature > , at least four months with an average mean temperature ≥ , at least one month with an average mean temperature ≥  and no significant precipitation difference between seasons. Although most summer days are slightly humid in Trevose, episodes of heat and high humidity can occur with heat index values > . The average wettest month is July which corresponds with the annual peak in thunderstorm activity. Episodes of extreme cold and wind can occur with wind chill values < . Ice storms and large snowstorms depositing ≥ 12 inches (30 cm) occur once every few years, particularly during nor’easters from December through February.

Ecology

According to the A. W. Kuchler U.S. potential natural vegetation types, Trevose would have a dominant vegetation type of Appalachian Oak (104) with a dominant vegetation form of Eastern Hardwood Forest (25). The average date of first spring leaf-out is March 25 and fall color typically peaks in late-October and early-November.

See also
Feasterville-Trevose, Pennsylvania
Growden Mansion

Notes

Census-designated places in Bucks County, Pennsylvania
Census-designated places in Pennsylvania